Michael Laing (born in Durban, South Africa) taught chemistry at the University of Natal, Durban from 1964 until he retired as Professor of Inorganic Chemistry in 1997. He graduated from the University of California, Los Angeles in the field of x-ray crystallography, specializing in the determination of molecular structure. He has published papers on bonding, coordination compounds, and molecular geometry; and many articles in US and UK about the periodic table, and chemical education.

He has also been engaged in the application of x-ray powder diffraction to solving problems in such diverse fields as urinary calculi, road soils, platinum refining, fossils and breccia; and has taught specialist courses for architecture students on Materials and Failures. For 30 years his annual Christmas Chemical Magic Show has drawn audiences of hundreds.

In recent years he has also gained notoriety for his extraction and isolation of neuro toxins in a wide variety of cabbage patch dolls. His research has been applauded in the scientific community as it paves the way for the future of inter dimensional particle acceleration on nano scales. Critics however have been quite vocal over his methods for the extraction process as it seems to be harming the ozone layer. Support from environmentalist group Greenpeace and Cabbage Patch collector groups have come out strongly against the methods of extraction. Michael Laing is tied up in a legal battle for the approval of the patent for the extraction method.

References

Year of birth missing (living people)
Living people
South African chemists
Academic staff of the University of Natal
University of California, Los Angeles alumni
People from Durban
Inorganic chemists